Islandora is a free and open-source software digital repository system based on Fedora Commons, Drupal and a host of additional applications. It is open source software (released under the GNU General Public License) and was originally developed at the University of Prince Edward Island by the Robertson Library.

Islandora may be used to create large, searchable collections of digital assets of any type and is domain-agnostic in terms of the type of content it can steward. It has a highly modular architecture with a number of key features.

Key Features 
 support for any file type (via the Fedora repository system)
 multi-language and functionality support via Drupal
 a modular Solution Pack framework for defining specific data models and associated behaviors, including standard Solution Packs for audio, PDF, images, paged content, videos, and web archives
 support for any XML metadata standard, including unique schemas
 a formbuilder module which allows the creation of a data-entry/editing form for any XML schema
 support for semantic ontologies and the creation of relationships between objects
 a flexible faceted search driven by Apache Solr
 micro service-based workflows for automating the transformation of assets
 editorial workflows for approving submissions to the repository

The current release of Islandora is 7.x-1.8 for Drupal 7. There is extensive documentation for the Islandora project, including a YouTube video channel. There are approximately 2 major releases of Islandora each year. Islandora source code is available for download from the Github organization and as a virtual machine image. Annual Islandora events include the Red Island Repository Institute and Islandora Camp.

Usage and backing 
As of 2020, 331 recorded implementations were noted.

Development history 
The original development team was 3 people, which as of 2013 had grown to dozens, including an "Agile software development" workflow.

References 

 Leggott, M. (2009). Islandora: a Drupal/Fedora Repository System. 4th International Conference on Open Repositories.

Bibliography 
The following Bibliography contains references to material that mentions or discusses Islandora.

Journal Articles and Published Conference Proceedings 
 Adewumi, A., Ikhu-Omoregbe, N. (2011). Institutional Repositories: Features, Architecture, Design and Implementation Technologies. Journal of Computing".
 Crowston, K. and Qin, J. (2011). A Capability Maturity Model for Scientific Data Management: Evidence from the Literature. "Proceedings of the American Society for Information Science and Technology", 48(1), 1–9. doi:10.1002/meet.2011.14504801036
 Gourley, D., & Viterbo, P. (2010). A Sustainable Repository Infrastructure for Digital Humanities: The DHO Experience. In M. Ioannides, D. Fellner, A. Georgopoulos, & D. Hadjimitsis (Eds.), Digital Heritage, Lecture Notes in Computer Science (Vol. 6436, pp. 473–481). Springer Berlin / Heidelberg.
 King, James. (2010). Building the Pandemic Influenza Digital Archive (PIDA) at the National Institutes of Health Library. Jefferson Digital Commons.
 MacDonald, J. and  Yule, D. (2012) Jarrow, Electronic Thesis, and Dissertation Software. The Code4Lib Journal Mercer, H., Koenig, J., McGeachin, R. B., & Tucker, S. L. (2011). Structure, Features, and Faculty Content in ARL Member Repositories. Journal of Academic Librarianship, 37(4), 333–342.
 Moore, R. W., Rajasekar, A., Wan, M. (2010). IRODS policy sets as standards for preservation. Roadmap for Digital Preservation Interoperability Framework Workshop, US-DPIF'10. (December 01, 2010). Acm International Conference Proceeding Series.
 Morton-Owens, E. G., Hanson, K. L., & Walls, I. (2011). Implementing Open-Source Software for Three Core Library Functions: A Stage-by-Stage Comparison. Journal of Electronic Resources in Medical Libraries, 8(1), 1–14. doi:10.1080/15424065.2011.551486
 Moses, D., Stapelfeldt, K. (2013). Renewing UPEI’s Institutional Repository: New Features for an Islandora-based Environment. The Code4Lib Journal, 21.
 Paiva, T. S. B., Mello, C. A., Soares, S., & Lima, M. G. Prohist: A Digital Library For Image Processing of Historical Documents.
 Pan, J., Lenhardt, C., Wilson, B., Palanisamy, G., Cook, R., & Shrestha, B. (2011). Geoscience data curation using a digital object model and open-source frameworks: Provenance applications. Geoscience and Remote Sensing Symposium (IGARSS), 2011 IEEE International (pp. 3815 –3818). doi:10.1109/IGARSS.2011.6050062
 Sefton, P., & Dickinson, D. (2011). Repositories post 2010: embracing heterogeneity in AWE, the Academic Working Environment. Journal of Digital Information, 12(2).
 Stuart, D., Aitken, B., Abbott, D., Chassanoff, A., Hedges, M., & McHugh, A. (2011). Content Models for Enhancement and Sustainability: Creating a Generic Framework for Digital Resources in the Arts and Humanities. In E. García-Barriocanal, Z. Cebeci, M. C. Okur, & A. Öztürk (Eds.), Metadata and Semantic Research, Communications in Computer and Information Science (Vol. 240, pp. 234–244). Springer Berlin Heidelberg.
 Thompson, J., Bainbridge, D., & Suleman, H. (2011). Towards Very Large Scale Digital Library Building in Greenstone Using Parallel Processing. In C. Xing, F. Crestani, & A. Rauber (Eds.), Digital Libraries: For Cultural Heritage, Knowledge Dissemination, and Future Creation, Lecture Notes in Computer Science (Vol. 7008, pp. 331–340). Springer Berlin / Heidelberg.
 Viterbo, P. B., & Gourley, D. (2010). Digital humanities and digital repositories: sustainable technology for sustainable communications. Proceedings of the 28th ACM International Conference on Design of Communication, SIGDOC  ’10 (pp. 109–114). New York, NY, USA: ACM. doi:10.1145/1878450.1878469
 Walters, T. O. (2009). Data Curation Program Development in U.S. Universities: The Georgia Institute of Technology Example. International Journal of Digital Curation, 4(3), 83–92. doi:10.2218/ijdc.v4i3.116
 Westra, B., Ramirez, M., Parham, S. W., & Scaramozzino, J. M. (2010). Science and Technology Resources on the Internet. Issues in Science and Technology Librarianship, 63.

 Theses, Dissertations, and Coursework 
 Ishida, M. (2011). Data management in the United States and Canada : academic libraries’ contribution. University of British Columbia, Graduate paper, 2011 Summer Term 1, LIBR 559L School of Library, Archival and Information Studies (SLAIS).
 Lopes, Luis Filipe Vieira da Silva. (2010). A Metadata Model for The Annotation Of Epidemiological Data. Masters Thesis (Dissertation). DOI: http://hdl.handle.net/10455/6698

 Presentations 
 Georgiev, A., & Grigorov, A. (2010, December 21). Developing a digital repository infrastructure for sharing digital resources in the teaching education community - Case Study. ShareTEC project to The Fedora UK and Ireland User Group met at the London School of Economics and Political Science (the LSE).
 Humphrey, C. (2010). Bridging data repositories University of Alberta. SPARC Digital Repositories.
 Leggott, M. (2009). Islandora: a Drupal/Fedora Repository System. 4th International Conference on Open Repositories.
 Ruest, N. (2013). The Islandora Web ARChive Solution Pack. Open Repositories 2013
 Zhang, Q. Ishida M. (2011). Research Data Management in Academic Libraries. Unlocking Knowledge Through Open Access.

Other 
 Courtney, N. D. (2010). More Technology for the Rest of Us: A Second Primer on Computing for the Non-IT Librarian. ABC-CLIO.
 Salo, Dorothea. (2010). Retooling libraries for the data challenge.
 Shearer, K. and Argáez, D. (2010) Addressing the Research Data Gap: A Review of Novel Services for Libraries. Canadian Association of Research Libraries (CARL).
 Walters, T., Skinner, K. (2011). New Roles for New times: Digital Curation for Preservation . Report Prepared for the Association of Research Libraries.

External links 
 
 Sample Islandora sites from the University of PEI

Free institutional repository software
Digital library software
Open-access archives
University of Prince Edward Island
Free software